Hardman Philips House, also known as Moshannon Hall and Halehurst, is a historic home located at Philipsburg, Centre County, Pennsylvania. The house was originally built as a -story, Georgian style building with a gable roof.  The original house was built about 1813.  It was later modified to its present form as a -story, 7-bay long dwelling with a gambrel roof.  The exterior is coated in stucco, and a full-length front and side porch encircles the first story.  Many of these modifications and additions took place about 1884.

It was added to the National Register of Historic Places in 1978.

References

Houses on the National Register of Historic Places in Pennsylvania
Houses completed in 1813
Houses in Centre County, Pennsylvania
National Register of Historic Places in Centre County, Pennsylvania